Ivakhnenko is a Ukrainian surname.

This surname is shared by the following people:

 Alexey Grigorevich Ivakhnenko (1913–2007), Soviet-Ukrainian mathematician
 Valentyna Ivakhnenko (born 1993), Russian tennis player

See also
 

Ukrainian-language surnames